The 2020 AFC Champions League qualifying play-offs were played from 14 to 28 January 2020. A total of 28 teams competed in the qualifying play-offs to decide the remaining eight of the 32 places in the group stage of the 2020 AFC Champions League.

Teams
The following 28 teams, split into two regions (West Region and East Region), entered the qualifying play-offs, consisting of three rounds:
8 teams entered in the preliminary round 1.
12 teams entered in the preliminary round 2.
8 teams entered in the play-off round.

Format

In the qualifying play-offs, each tie was played as a single match. Extra time and a penalty shoot-out were used to decide the winner if necessary (Regulations Article 9.2).

Schedule
The schedule of each round was as follows.

Bracket

The bracket of the qualifying play-offs for each region was determined based on the association ranking of each team, with the team from the higher-ranked association hosting the match. Teams from the same association could not be placed into the same tie. The eight winners of the play-off round (four each from both West Region and East Region) advanced to the group stage to join the 24 direct entrants. All losers in each round from associations with only play-off slots entered the AFC Cup group stage.

Play-off West 1
 Al-Ain advanced to Group D.

Play-off West 2
 Al-Ahli advanced to Group A.

Play-off West 3
 Shahr Khodro advanced to Group B.

Play-off West 4
 Esteghlal advanced to Group A.

Play-off East 1
 FC Seoul advanced to Group E.

Play-off East 2
 Shanghai SIPG advanced to Group H.

Play-off East 3
 FC Tokyo advanced to Group F.

Play-off East 4
 Melbourne Victory advanced to Group E.

Preliminary round 1

Summary
A total of eight teams played in the preliminary round 1.

|+West Region

|}

|+East Region

|}

West Region

East Region

Preliminary round 2

Summary
A total of 16 teams played in the preliminary round 2: twelve teams which entered in this round, and the four winners of the preliminary round 1.

|+West Region

|}

|+East Region

|}

West Region

East Region

Play-off round

Summary
A total of 16 teams played in the play-off round: eight teams which entered in this round, and the eight winners of the preliminary round 2.

|+West Region

|}

|+East Region

|}

West Region

East Region

Notes

References

External links
, the-AFC.com
AFC Champions League 2020, stats.the-AFC.com

1
January 2020 sports events in Asia